Alisa Kwitney (born 1964) is a writer of comedic romance novels and graphic novels.

Biography
Kwitney grew up in New York City, on Manhattan's Upper West Side, the daughter of science fiction author Robert Sheckley and Ziva Kwitney.

Alisa Kwitney has a BA in English from Wesleyan University, where she received the Horgan Writing Prize for Fiction, and an MFA in fiction from Columbia University, where she received a scholarship of merit. Her master's thesis was published by HarperCollins as her first novel, Till The Fat Lady Sings, in 1991. Kwitney was an editor for Vertigo Comics. She is currently the editor for Liminal Comics at Brain Mill Press.

Kwitney lives in an old farmhouse two hours from Manhattan with her husband and two children.

Bibliography

Novels
 Till The Fat Lady Sings (1991) 
 The Dominant Blonde published by Avon Books in June, 2002 
 Does She or Doesn't She? published by Avon Books in June, 2003 
 On the Couch published (paperback) by HarperCollins, July 1, 2004 
 Sex as a Second Language: A Novel published by Atria Books, April 25, 2006 978-0-74326890-5
 Flirting in Cars published by Atria Books, August, 2007, 978-0-7432-6897-4
 The Better to Hold You (as Alisa Sheckley) by Ballantine Books, 2009, 978-0-345-50587-3
 Moonburn (as Alisa Sheckley) by Ballantine Books, 2009, 978-0-345-50588-0
 New Avengers: Breakout(adapted from the graphic novel by Brian Michael Bendis and David Finch) Marvel, 2013, 978-0-7851-6517-0
 Cadaver & Queen published by Harlequin Teen,  February 2018, 1335470468

Graphic novels
 The Dreaming: Beyond The Shores of Night (editor and contributing author) DC Comics, (1998) 1-56389-393-2
 Destiny: A Chronicle of Deaths Foretold (Nominated for Best Limited Series Eisner Award) (March 2000) 
 Vertigo Visions: The Phantom Stranger (October 2003) 
 Token (November 2008) 
 A Flight of Angels (Contributing author) by Vertigo/DC Comics (2011) 978-1-4012-2147-8
 Batman: No Man's Land Volume 3 (Contributing author) by DC Comics (2012) 978-1-4012-3456-0
 Mystik U by DC Comics, November, 2017

Non-Fiction
 Child of Mine (Contributing author) (1997) 
 Vertigo Visions: Artwork from the Cutting Edge of Comics (2000) (Nominated for Locus Best Art Book) 0-8230-5603-1
 The Sandman: King of Dreams (2003) 0-8118-3592-8

See also

 The Sandman

References

External links

Wesleyan University alumni
20th-century American novelists
21st-century American novelists
American women novelists
Living people
1964 births
Robert Sheckley
20th-century American women writers
21st-century American women writers
Columbia University School of the Arts alumni
21st-century American male writers